Bathyeliasona nigra is a deep-sea scale worm which occurs widely in the Indian, Pacific and Atlantic Oceans from a depth range of about 2,500-5,000m.

Description
Bathyeliasona nigra has 18 segments and 8 pairs of elytra, with slaty-black pigmentation. The anterior margin of the prostomium comprises a pair of acute anterior projections and the lateral antennae are absent. The notochaetae are about as thick as the neurochaetae and bidentate neurochaetae are absent.

References

Phyllodocida